Helepolis (meaning: "Taker of Cities") is the Greek name for a movable siege tower.

The most famous was that invented by Polyidus of Thessaly, and improved by Demetrius I of Macedon and Epimachus of Athens, for the Siege of Rhodes (305 BC). Descriptions of it were written by Diodorus Siculus,  Vitruvius, Plutarch, and in the Athenaeus Mechanicus.

Description

The three exposed sides were rendered fireproof with iron plates, and stories divided the interior, connected by two broad flights of stairs, one for ascent and one for descent. The machine weighed 160 tons, and required 3,400 men working in relays to move it, 200 turning a large capstan driving the wheels via a belt, and the rest pushing from behind. The casters permitted lateral movement, so the entire apparatus could be steered towards the desired attack point, while always keeping the siege engines inside aimed at the walls, and the protective body of the machine directly between the city walls and the men pushing behind it.

The Helepolis bore a fearsome complement of heavy armaments, with two  catapults, and one  (classified by the weight of the projectiles they threw) on the first floor, three 60 lb catapults on the second, and two  on each of the next five floors. Apertures, shielded by mechanically adjustable shutters, lined with skins stuffed with wool and seaweed to render them fireproof, perforated the forward wall of the tower for firing the missile weapons. On each of the top two floors, soldiers could use two light dart throwers to easily clear the walls of defenders.

Siege of Rhodes

As the Helepolis was pushed towards the city, the Rhodians managed to dislodge some of the metal plates, and Demetrius ordered it withdrawn from battle to protect it from being burned. Following the failure of the siege, the Helepolis along with the other siege engines were abandoned, and the people of Rhodes melted down their metal plating and sold abandoned weapons, using the materials and money to build a statue of their patron god, Helios, the Colossus of Rhodes, which became known as one of the ancient Seven Wonders of the World.

Vitruvius offers an alternative version, in which the Rhodians begged Diognetus, once the town architect of Rhodes, to find a way to capture the Helepolis. By cover of night, he had the Rhodians knock a hole through the city wall to channel large amounts of water, mud and sewage onto the area where the Helepolis was expected to attack the following day. Diognetus was successful; the tower was brought forth to the anticipated attack position and became irretrievably stuck in the mire. Once the siege was lifted, the Rhodians sold Demetrius's abandoned siege engines and used the money to erect the enormous Colossus of Rhodes.

Later use

Demetrius again used a similar machine in 292 BC against the Thebans in the siege of Thebes and captured the city the following year.

In subsequent ages, siege engineers continued to use the name helepolis for moving towers which carried battering rams, as well as for machines for throwing spears and heavy stones. The Byzantines much later used the term helepolis to describe a very different siege engine; the traction trebuchet. The first recorded use of this terminology was by Theophylact Simocatta, in describing the siege of Tiflis in the Byzantine–Sassanid War of 602–628.

References

Connolly, Peter. Greece and Rome at War. London: Greenhill Books, 1998.
Warry, John. Warfare in the Classical World. Salamanda Books.
Campbell, Duncan B. Greek and Roman Siege Machinery 399 BC-AD 363. Osprey Publishing, 2003.

External links

Helepolis at LacusCurtius
Ancient Greek war machines: The Helepolis, a fortified wheeled tower

Ancient Greek military terminology
Siege engines
Hellenistic military engineering
Colossus of Rhodes